Tracey Damigella-Lohse (born  1969) is an American former competitive figure skater. As a single skater, she is the 1985 Grand Prix International St. Gervais champion, 1987 Novarat Trophy champion, 1985 Nebelhorn Trophy silver medalist, and 1986 U.S. national pewter medalist.

Personal life 
Tracey Damigella was born  1969 and grew up in Miramar, Florida, the daughter of Marion and Frank Damigella. She was raised with three siblings – Gail, Robert, and Toni. Her sister, Toni, competed in women's singles luge at the 1984 Winter Olympics.

Damigella has a daughter, Sofia Goddard (born in 1999), with Scott Goddard, a marble granite contractor whom she married in April 1994 in Los Angeles. Now known as Damigella-Lohse, she resides in Cooper City, Florida.

Career 
Damigella began learning to skate at the Polar Palace in Miami, Florida. She represented the United States in ladies' singles for most of her career. In February 1985, she won the junior silver medal at the U.S. Championships, finishing second to Jill Trenary. Internationally, she won gold medals at the 1985 Grand Prix International St. Gervais champion and 1987 Novarat Trophy. She was awarded silver at the 1985 Nebelhorn Trophy and the pewter medal at the 1986 U.S. Championships. Based mainly at the Lighthouse Point Ice Skating Arena in Florida, she also took lessons from Carlo Fassi for five years at the Broadmoor World Arena in Colorado Springs, Colorado. Her skating expenses, nearly $50,000 a year, were covered mainly by her parents who sold a house in Boston and a motel in South Florida.

Damigella won the ladies' title at the Australian Championships in the 1989–90 season, but never appeared for Australia internationally. In the summer of 1991, she and Doug Williams began a pairs partnership, training in North Hollywood, California. The two represented the United States at the 1992 NHK Trophy and 1993 Nations Cup.

In NBC's 1994 made-for-TV movie Tonya and Nancy: The Inside Story, Damigella served as the skating double for Heather Langenkamp, who played Nancy Kerrigan. She has worked as a skating coach at the Sunrise Ice Skating Center and Pines Ice Arena in Pembroke Pines, Florida.

Programs

Competitive highlights

Pairs with Williams

Ladies' singles

References 

1969 births
American female pair skaters
American female single skaters
Damigella, Tracey
People from Miramar, Florida
People from Cooper City, Florida
21st-century American women
Sportspeople from Broward County, Florida